Shangshui County is a county in the east of Henan province, China. It is under the administration of Zhoukou city.

Administrative divisions
As 2012, this county is divided to 3 subdistricts, 9 towns and 11 townships.
Subdistricts
Subdistricts:

Towns

Townships

Climate

References

County-level divisions of Henan
Zhoukou